Jerzy Piotr Homziuk (born 8 March 1949) is a Polish athlete. He competed in the men's long jump at the 1972 Summer Olympics.

References

1949 births
Living people
Athletes (track and field) at the 1972 Summer Olympics
Polish male long jumpers
Olympic athletes of Poland
People from Międzyrzec Podlaski
Sportspeople from Lublin Voivodeship